Purral is a district of the Goicoechea canton, in the San José province of Costa Rica.

History 
Purral was created on 23 July 1991 by Decreto Ejecutivo 20587-G. Segregated from Ipís.

Geography 
Purral has an area of  km² and an elevation of  metres.

Demographics 

For the 2011 census, Purral had a population of  inhabitants.

Transportation

Road transportation 
The district is covered by the following road routes:
 National Route 218

References 

Districts of San José Province
Populated places in San José Province